Robert Walker (4 July 1891 – 23 August 1965) was an Australian rules footballer who played with Essendon in the Victorian Football League (VFL).

Family
The son of William John Walker, and Mary Jane Walker, née Spong, Robert Walker was born at Buln Buln, Victoria on 4 July 1891.

He married Ivy Gledhill on 3 November 1917.

Death
He died at Frankston, Victoria on 23 August 1965.

Notes

References
 
 Maplestone, M., Flying Higher: History of the Essendon Football Club 1872–1996, Essendon Football Club, (Melbourne), 1996. 
 M.A.P.. Contests, The Leader, (Saturday, 31 July 1915), p.20.

External links 

Bob Walker's profile at Australianfootball.com

1891 births
1965 deaths
Australian rules footballers from Victoria (Australia)
Essendon Football Club players
Footscray Football Club (VFA) players